Van Dam's vanga (Xenopirostris damii) is a species of bird in the family Vangidae.
It is endemic to Madagascar.

Its natural habitat is subtropical or tropical dry forests. Males may be identified by their black hood whereas females have only a black cap.

Conservation Status
At present, the species is endangered under the ICUN Species Red List. It has a decreasing population trend of between 1500 and 7000 individuals. The species inhabits a very small range, isolated to just two confirmed sites, one of which is the Ankarafantsika National Park. Its habitat is under increasing pressure from human encroachment and fire.

References

External links

BirdLife Species Factsheet.

Van Dam's vanga
Van Dam's vanga
Taxonomy articles created by Polbot